JDS Tokachi (DE-218) was the fourth ship of the s of Japan Maritime Self-Defense Force.

Development and design 
The main anti-submarine (ASW) weapon was changed from the M/50  ASW rocket launcher to the ASROC anti-submarine missile. The octuple launcher for ASROC was stationed at the mid-deck, and the entire ship design was prescribed by this stationing.

Construction and career
Tokachi was laid down on 11 December 1970 at Mitsui Engineering & SHipbuilding, Tamano and launched on 25 November 1971. The vessel was commissioned on 17 May 1972 into the 35th Escort Corps of the Ominato District Force.

On August 31, 1973, the 35th Escort Corps was reorganized under the 4th Escort Corps group.

On March 27, 1982, the 35th Escort Corps was reorganized into the Ominato District Force.

On March 27, 1985, she was transferred to the 38th Escort Corps of the Kure District Force, and the home port was transferred to Kure.

Dismantled at Yamaji Sangyo in Okayama City in 1999 after being removed from the register on 15 April 1998.

Gallery

References

1971 ships
Ships built by Mitsui Engineering and Shipbuilding
Chikugo-class destroyer escorts